Worms? is a software toy written by David Maynard for the Atari 8-bit family and ported to the Commodore 64. Published by Electronic Arts in 1983, it was one of initial batch of releases from the company. Worms? is an interactive version of Paterson's Worms. Maynard later worked on the 8-bit word processor from Electronic Arts, Cut & Paste.

On March 17, 2021, the source code to Worms? was made available under the MIT License.

Gameplay

The game is abstract, like Conway's Game of Life, but the player's ostensible goal is to optimally program one or more worms (each a sort of cellular automaton) to grow and survive as long as possible. The game area is divided up into hexagonal cells, and the worms are programmed to move in a particular direction for each combination of filled-in and empty frame segments in their immediate vicinity. Over the course of a game, the player needs to give the worm less and less input, and more and more moves by the worm results in the encountering of a familiar situation for which the worm has already been trained. As the worms move, they generate aleatoric music.

Development
When David Maynard finished developing the game for his Atari 800 in the fall of 1982, it was titled Sumo Worms. It was written in the Forth programming language.

Reception
Allen Doum reviewed the game for Computer Gaming World, and stated that "Worms? can be played competitively, either by teams or individuals or can be used solitaire as a pattern drawing puzzle. Its sound and graphics are excellent, and some of the graphics elements and the speed of the game can be varied." Orson Scott Card in Compute! gave complimentary reviews to the EA games Worms?, M.U.L.E., and Archon: The Light and the Dark. He said of the trio that "they are original; they do what they set out to do very, very well; they allow the player to take part in the creativity; they do things that only computers can do". William Michael Brown for Electronic Fun with Computers & Games praised its originality and rated it with 3 joysticks, although he said that it was not a game for everyone, reason why it wasn't rated with 4 joysticks.

Leo Laporte wrote in Hi-Res said that Worms? was "Very nice, very pretty, very boring ... I've been playing with this program for two weeks. It hasn't gotten any more interesting". Compute!'s Gazettes reviewer called Worms? for the Commodore 64 "one of the most fascinating games I've played in a long time. It's so different from anything else that it quickly captivated me. Worms? tournaments become popular among the staff of Compute! ... [It] is as much fun to watch as it is to play". He added that part of its appeal was that "The game is hard to master. It's easy to play, but seems almost impossible to play well time after time".

Compute! listed the game in May 1988 as one of "Our Favorite Games", writing that four years after its introduction "Worms? is still in a class by itself", requiring "a sense of strategy as well as proficiency at joystick maneuvers".

Legacy
In 2021, Maynard put a variant of the Worms? concept the web, playable in a browser, as DARWORMS.

References

External links
Worms? at Atari Mania

"Paterson's Worm", Michael Beeler, MIT AI Memo #290, June 1973.

1983 video games
Atari 8-bit family games
Commodore 64 games
Commercial video games with freely available source code
Non-games
Cellular automaton software
Electronic Arts games
Formerly proprietary software
Open-source video games
Software using the MIT license
Ariolasoft games
Single-player video games
Video games developed in the United States